The Intruders (also known as Skippy and the Intruders) is a 1969 Australian film directed by Lee Robinson. It is a spin-off of the popular Skippy the Bush Kangaroo TV series.

Synopsis
A gang of criminals led by Meredith is looking for sunken treasure off Mallacoota, pretending to be diving for abalone. Sonny, son of Matt Hammond, the Chief Ranger of Waratah National Park, investigates with their family friend, Clancy. Sonny and Clancy are kidnapped. Skippy comes to the rescue. After a speedboat chase and a fight in the sand dunes, Meredith is captured.

Cast
Ed Devereaux as Matt Hammond
Tony Bonner as Jerry King
Ken James as Mark
Garry Pankhurst as Sonny
Liza Goddard as Clancy
Ron Graham as Yordan
Jeanie Drynan as Meg
Kevin Miles as Meredith
Jack Hume as Curtis
Jeff Ashby as Graigoe
George Assang as Sigigi
John Unicomb as Bernie
Mike Dawkins as Scott
Robert Bruning
Harry Lawrence
Skippy

Production
Filming began in October 1968 using the same crew and locations as the TV series. Additional location shooting was done at Mallacoota in Victoria, some 470 km south of the fictional Waratah National Park (Ku-ring-gai Chase) and in Sydney.

Release
The film failed to match the popularity of the TV series and was not a box office success. John McCallum later claimed they:
Got the money back on the film but we thought it would be a bigger success in the cinema. If they could see it for nothing at home, the Mums and Dads weren't too keen to take the kids and pay at the cinema. We sold it to the Children's Film Foundation in England and they did well with it. They cut it down to a 60-minute version and played in Saturday mornings in the cinemas.

References

External links

The Intruders at National Film and Sound Archive
The Intruders at Australian Screen Online
The Intruders at Oz Movies

1969 films
Australian children's films
Films directed by Lee Robinson
Skippy the Bush Kangaroo
Films set in Sydney
1960s English-language films